Ryan Mahrle (born February 8, 1985 in Troy, Michigan) is an American professional ice hockey defenseman for the Newcastle Vipers of the EIHL.

Playing career
Undrafted, Mahrle completed his amateur career with Western Michigan University of the CCHA. Ryan turned professional after his senior year with the Broncos, playing with the Kalamazoo Wings of the UHL, at the end of the 2006-07 season. Ryan then spent the next two seasons in the ECHL with the Gwinnett Gladiators and the Bakersfield Condors.

On June 4, 2009, Mahrle was signed to a one-year contract with the Newcastle Vipers of the EIHL.

Career statistics

References

External links

1985 births
American men's ice hockey defensemen
Bakersfield Condors (1998–2015) players
Gwinnett Gladiators players
Ice hockey players from Michigan
Kalamazoo Wings (UHL) players
Living people
Newcastle Vipers players
Western Michigan Broncos men's ice hockey players